Wang Bingzhang (born December 30, 1947) is a Chinese human rights activist and founder of two Chinese pro-democracy movements. He was abducted in Vietnam in June 2002 and detained by Chinese secret police. The Chinese government announced his detention in December 2002, charging him with espionage and terrorism. He was sentenced to life in prison and is considered a political prisoner of China.

Biography
Wang Bingzhang was born on December 30, 1947, in Shijiazhuang, Hebei, China. He graduated from Beijing Medical University and served as a doctor for eight years. In 1979, he was sponsored by the Chinese government to study abroad in McGill University, Canada where he obtained his Ph.D. degree in pathology in 1982. Wang Bingzhang is the first citizen of the People's Republic of China to get a doctorate degree in North America.

In 1982, Wang established China Spring, the first pro-democracy Chinese magazine overseas. He later traveled back to China and co-founded two opposition parties, the Chinese Freedom Democracy Party and Chinese Democracy Justice Party in 1989 and 1998, respectively. The latter led to his arrest in China. He was expelled from the country, but was not sentenced.
In early 2002, Wang was in Thailand where Royal Thai Police investigated him at the request of the Communist Party of China. Finding no evidence against him and fearing for his safety, Dr. Wang was urged to leave the country.

In June 2002, Wang went to Vietnam with Yue Wu and Zhang Qi where they were seized by Chinese secret agents. In December 2002, the Chinese government announced his arrest after six months in custody.

In February 2003, Wang was sentenced to life in prison, on charges of espionage and terrorism. His trial was closed to the public and lasted for one day. He is imprisoned in the Shaoguan Prison.

In March 2006, Wang was punished for misbehaving when he went on hunger strike to plead for release to pay a final respect to his father at his funeral; but he was handcuffed by and locked with a jail guard in his jail cell.  This resulted in prolonged punishment.  Visitation rights were restored in November 2006.  According to Dr. Bing Wu Wang, Wang's younger brother, his physical health had deteriorated rapidly since the last visitation.  This was due, according to Wang, to a new prison warden who served much lower food quality, harsher physical abuse and intense political study sessions.

Wang Bingzhang is a loyal Christian. In Nov. 2017, the first edition of the book written by Wang Bingzhang during his time as a political prisoner was published. The book is about decoding the Bible. The publication ceremony was at the Bible Museum in Washington DC on the 19th of November.

Various international organizations, including the United Nations, Amnesty International, Human Rights Watch, Worldrights, and the Raoul Wallenberg Centre for Human Rights have voiced their opposition to Dr. Wang's imprisonment, saying China is arbitrarily detaining him. The United States and Canadian legislatures have both passed legislative bills in support of Wang and in denunciation of the CCP's actions.

See also
Chinese democracy movement
List of Chinese dissidents
documentary film entitled "Inside These Walls" (2016), documenting Wang Bingzhang's family's fight for his freedom

Notes

External links
Worldrights
"China's veteran dissident" (BBC)
 Chinese Democracy Justice Party website

1947 births
Living people
Chinese dissidents
Chinese democracy activists
Chinese human rights activists
Chinese prisoners sentenced to life imprisonment
Prisoners sentenced to life imprisonment by the People's Republic of China
McGill University Faculty of Medicine alumni
Chinese political prisoners